To Serve Man is the debut studio album by American deathgrind band Cattle Decapitation, released in 2002. The title is a reference to the Twilight Zone episode "To Serve Man".

Critical reception

Exclaim! wrote that the band "has entered the upper realm of gore-grinders," and praised the "nice, clear production sound ... that allows us to hear exactly what it is that gore-grind bands do with their instruments: grind, slash and hack their way through speedy and short bursts of dissonant grindcore."

Track listing

Personnel
Cattle Decapitation
 Travis Ryan – vocals
 Josh Elmore – guitar
 Troy Oftedal – bass
 David Astor – drums
Production
 Juan Urteage – engineering, mastering
 Mike Blanchard – assistant engineering
 Wes Benscoter – cover art
 Brian Ames – graphic design
 Ryan Loyko – photography
 Myke Miazio – band logo

References

2002 debut albums
Cattle Decapitation albums
Metal Blade Records albums
Albums with cover art by Wes Benscoter